Pedro Noguera (born August 7, 1959) is the Emery Stoops and Joyce King Stoops Dean of the University of Southern California's Rossier School of Education. He is recognized as a leading scholar of urban public education, equity, and school reform.

Noguera holds a B.A. and M.A. in sociology and a teaching credential from Brown University and a Ph.D. in sociology from the University of California, Berkeley.

Books

As author
 The Imperatives of Power: Regime survival and the basis of political support in Grenada, 1951-1991 (1997). New York: Peter Lang Publishing, Inc.
 City Schools and the American Dream: Fulfilling the Promise of Public Education (2003). New York: Teachers College Press. Winner, Forward Magazine Award for best book in education 2003; American Association of Educational Studies, Book of the Year Award, 2004.
 (with Jean Yonomura Wing) Unfinished Business: Closing the Achievement in Our Schools (2006). San Francisco, CA: Josey Bass.
 The Trouble With Black Boys: Reflections on Race, Equity and the Future of Public Education (2008). San Francisco: Wiley and Sons. (Winner American Education Studies Association Critics Choice Award; Schott Foundation Award for Research on Race and Gender; Scholastic Publishers Award)
 (with A. Wade Boykin) Creating the Opportunity to Learning: Moving from Research to Practice to Close the Achievement Gap (2011). Washington, D.C.: Association for Supervision and Curriculum Development.
 (with Edward Fergus and Margary Martin) Schooling for Resilience: Improving Life Trajectories for Black and Latino Boys (2014). Cambridge: Harvard Education Press.
 The Schools We Need: Education, Inequality and America's Future (forthcoming). New York: New Press.

As editor
 (with Shawn Ginwright and Julio Camarota) Beyond Resistance! Youth Activism and Community Change (2006). New York: Routledge.
 (with Carlos Alberto Torres) Social Justice Education for Teachers: Paulo Freire and the Possible Dream (2008). London, UK: Sense Publishers.
 (with William Ayers, Gloria Ladson-Billings, and Gregory Mitchie) City Kids, City Schools (2008). New York: New Press.
 (with Aida Hurtado and Edward Fergus) Invisible No More: Understanding and Responding to the Disenfranchisement of Latino Males (2011). New York: Routledge.
 (with Alan Blankstein) Excellence Through Equity (2015). San Francisco: Corwin Press.
 (with Jill Pierce and Roey Ahram) Race, Equity and Education: The Pursuit of Equality in Education 60 Years After Brown (2015). New York: Springer Press.

Awards
 1997 Wellness Foundation Award for Research on Youth Violence
 1997 University of California's Distinguished Teaching Award
 2001 Honorary Doctorate, University of San Francisco
 2001 Centennial Medal, Philadelphia University
 2003 Forward Magazine Gold Award (City Schools and the American Dream)
 2003 AESA Critics Choice Book Award (City Schools and the American Dream)
 2005 Whitney Young Award for Leadership in Education
 2006 Eugene Carrothers Award for Public Service
 2008 Schott Foundation Award for Research on Race and Gender
 2008 AESA Critics Choice Book Award (The Trouble With Black Boys)
 2009 Scholastic Corporation Education Hero Award
 2011 Honorary Doctorate, Bank Street College
 2012 Honorary Doctorate, Metropolitan College of New York
 2013 Honorary Doctorate, Lewis and Clark College, Portland Oregon
 2013 Kappa Delta Pi Honor Society
 2013 Martin Luther King Award for Leadership in Social Justice, New York
 2014 National Academy of Education
 2014 Award for Exemplary Scholarship Advanced Center for Behavioral Sciences
 2015 National Association of Secondary School Principals for Distinguished Service to Public Education
 2015 Horace Mann Award
 2015 Honorary Doctorate, Duquesne University
 2015 Honorary Doctorate, Lesley University

References

External links 
 
 
 

Living people
Educational researchers
University of California, Los Angeles faculty
University of California, Berkeley alumni
Brown University alumni
Sociologists of education
1959 births